The Brigham Young University Creamery is a grocery store for Brigham Young University students living in residence halls on campus. Students may purchase food and other items using their Cougar Cash accounts (an on-campus debit card system) or traditional payment methods. BYU Creamery has four locations in Provo, Utah: Creamery on Ninth East, Helaman Creamery, Wyview Creamery, and the Creamery Outlet.

History

The Creamery opened in 1949, providing milk for Brigham Young University’s campus. Soon, it began to sell ice cream, cheeses, and other University-produced dairy products. Today, in addition to its own line of foods, the Creamery sells various general supermarket items, from Rice Krispies to paper plates. The Creamery on Ninth East opened in August 2000, replacing Kent's Market, which closed during the 1998 – 1999 school year. According to the BYU Dining Services statistics, more than 191,000 gallons of Creamery ice cream are served each year.

A Wymount location, in the Wymount Terrace Administration Building, closed in 2010.

In 2018, as a part of 21 years of most "Stone Cold Sober" school by Princeton review, BYU Creamery released a new flavor of milk, mint brownie chocolate milk.

Trivia 
BYU's building block system abbreviates the Creamery on Ninth East as CONE.

References

External links 
 BYU Creamery
 Brigham Young University Homepage
 The Creamery's distribution partner, Western Family
 Restaurants and Institutions article on the Creamery on 9th's opening

Brigham Young University buildings
Retail buildings in Utah
Supermarkets of the United States
1949 establishments in Utah